John Colinton Moore  (born 16 November 1936) is a former Australian politician. He was a Liberal member of the House of Representatives for over 25 years, serving between 1975 and 2001, and was a minister in the Fraser and Howard governments.

Background and early career
Moore was born in Rockhampton, Queensland. He was raised on a cattle station west of Bowen. His early education was through the Australian correspondence system used for isolated families. He finished his secondary education at The Armidale School, an Anglican boarding school for boys, before entering the University of Queensland and graduating with a Bachelor of Commerce with additional study in Accounting.

Before he entered politics, Moore had a very successful career as a businessman and stock broker. He spent four years (1960–1963) with A.R. Walker & Co. before forming his own brokerage (John Moore & Company) in 1964. He was a member of the Brisbane Stock Exchange from 1961 until 1974. He grew his firm into the largest single trader business in Queensland, opening offices in regional centres there and in New South Wales. He also held directorship or board membership in a number of Australian companies, such as Brandt Limited and Phillips. He was a board member of the Australian subsidiary of some multinational investment firms including Merrill Lynch and Citigroup. Moore was appointed to the Council of The Australian National University in 1971, and served as a Councillor until 1976.

Moore became a member of the Liberal Party in 1964, and by 1966 was serving in its state Executive Committee in Queensland. He was President of the Queensland Party twice; from 1973 to 1976 and again from 1984 to 1990. By party rules this also made him a member of the Federal Executive Committee (FEC) of the party. He served on the FEC in one role or another for almost thirty years.

Political career
Moore was elected to the House of Representatives for the Division of Ryan in Brisbane at the 1975 federal election. His first ministerial office was during the fourth Fraser government, when he was Minister for Business and Consumer Affairs from 1980 to 1982. He was forced to resign from this portfolio when it was shown that fellow minister Michael MacKellar had brought a television into Australia without paying customs duty and that Moore as the minister responsible for Customs had failed to adequately respond to a report of the incident.

While the Labor governments of Hawke and Keating were in power 1983–1996, Moore served in the opposition's Shadow Cabinet for several key ministries including Finance, Industry and Commerce, and Communications.

In 1985 Liberal leader Andrew Peacock chose John Moore to challenge deputy Liberal leader John Howard but Howard retained the position beating Moore in a vote by Liberal partyroom members. 
This led to Peacock resigning as leader and Howard elected in his place. 
Moore again contested the deputy leadership now vacated by Howard's elevation as leader but the position was ultimately won by Neil Brown.
 
In March 1996 Moore was appointed to the Cabinet in the new Howard Coalition government, as Minister for Industry, Science and Tourism and Vice-President of the Executive Council. In this position Moore had a major role in shaping new government policies affecting the motor vehicle and pharmaceutical industries. In cooperation with industrial leaders, he created a long range policy package, "Investing for Growth."

In 1996, Moore came close to being forced to resign a ministry for the second time in his career, when it was discovered that his share holdings included significant investments that could potentially create a conflict of interest with his ministerial portfolio. These investments breached the Howard's ministerial code of conduct, but Moore was allowed to stay on.

After the 1998 election, Moore was appointed as Minister for Defence. The most significant events during this period were the deployment of forces to East Timor as a part of the U.N. peace-keeping effort and the upgrade and operationalisation of the Collins Class Submarine Fleet. Famously, Moore had a falling out with the Secretary of the Department of Defence, Paul Barratt, resulting in the termination of Barratt's employment contract. Moore's most lasting legacy within the Australian Defence Force was the White Paper Defence 2000: Our Future Defence Force, released late in his ministry. Howard said: "The Defence White Paper is the most far-sighted reshaping of Australia's defence capability in a generation. It would not have been possible without John Moore's determination to improve management within Defence and also win new resources for the ADF".

During the course of his second term in government, Howard reorganised Cabinet, and appointed Peter Reith as the Minister for Defence, with effect from 30 January 2001. Moore therefore left Cabinet as Howard did not move him to another portfolio. Moore then resigned his seat in Parliament on 5 February 2001. His resignation came at a bad time for the government, and the subsequent Ryan by-election saw Labor take the normally comfortably safe Liberal seat.

In 2015, Moore and three other former MPs brought a case before the High Court of Australia, purporting that reductions to their retirement allowances and limitations on the number of "domestic return trips per year" under the Members of Parliament (Life Gold Pass) Act 2002 was unconstitutional under S51(xxxi) of the Constitution of Australia. They lost the case in 2016, with the court finding that Parliament was entitled to vary the terms of allowances.

Honours
Moore was appointed an Officer of the Order of Australia in 2004 for service to the community through the Australian Parliament, to the development of strategic industry policy, and to both policy and management reform in the defence sector.

References

External links
Department of Defence 2000 White Paper overview
 

1936 births
Living people
Liberal Party of Australia members of the Parliament of Australia
Members of the Cabinet of Australia
Members of the Australian House of Representatives for Ryan
Members of the Australian House of Representatives
People from Rockhampton
Officers of the Order of Australia
People educated at the Southport School
Defence ministers of Australia
21st-century Australian politicians
20th-century Australian politicians
Government ministers of Australia